The Janzur Museum (also known as the Janzour Museum) is an archaeological museum located in Janzur, Libya. The museum showcases a funerary complex that is still under excavation by the Archaeology Department in Tripoli.

See also 

 List of museums in Libya

References 

Museums with year of establishment missing
Tripolitania
Archaeological museums in Libya